Pauline Étienne (born 26 June 1989) is a Belgian actress who has received numerous awards for her acting. Her notable films include Le Bel Âge and  Silent Voice, for which she won the Lumières Award for Most Promising Actress in 2010. She is known for her lead role in the 2013 film The Nun, directed by Guillaume Nicloux, for which she received two nominations at the 4th Magritte Awards, winning Best Actress and a nomination at the 39th César Awards.

Life and career 
Pauline Étienne grew up in Ixelles. She had an early interest in the theatre and music and joined a theatre workshop in her adolescence.

At age 18, she made her debut on the screen with a minor role in the Belgium film  Élève libre (2008), directed by Joachim Lafosse. Pauline Étienne received the award for Most Promising Actress.

In 2009, her breakthrough came with Le Bel Âge in which she played opposite Michel Piccoli, and for which she won an actress prize at the Festival international des jeunes réalisateurs de Saint-Jean-de-Luz. Her work in Qu'un seul tienne et les autres suivront, directed by  Léa Fehner, won her the Prix Lumière best actress newcomer award, then the Étoile d'or de la presse de la révélation féminine in 2010. 

In 2013 she appeared in a new screen version of Denis Diderot's The Nun. She received two nominations for her outstanding performance for her role as the nun Suzanne, including winning the best actress award in the 4th Magritte Awards. In 2014 she had main roles for the films Eden and Tokio Fiancée for which she won Best Actress.

In 2016, she played a recurring role as Céline Delorme in the French political thriller television series The Bureau directed by Éric Rochant.

In 2018, Pauline appeared in her first English-language movie, Old Boys, in which she plays the main role of Agnes.

In 2020, she played the lead role in the Belgian apocalyptic sci-fi drama thriller streaming television series Into the Night.

Filmography

Film 

 2008 : Private Lessons directed by Joachim Lafosse - Delphine
 2009 : Le Bel Âge directed by Laurent Perreau - Claire
 2009 : Silent Voice directed by Léa Fehner - Laure
 2010 : Black Heaven directed by Gilles Marchand - Marion
 2012 : Paradis perdu directed by Ève Deboise - Lucie
 2013 : The Nun, directed by Guillaume Nicloux - Suzanne Simonin
 2013 : 2 Autumns, 3 Winters directed by Sébastien Betbeder - Lucie 
 2014 : Eden directed by Mia Hansen-Løve - Louise 
 2014 : Tokio Fiancée directed by Stefan Liberski - Amélie
 2017 : The Midwife directed by Martin Provost - Cécile Amado
 2018 : Old Boys directed by Toby MacDonald - Agnes

 Short films	
 2010 : Where the Boys Are? directed by Bertrand Bonello - Pauline	
 2010 : Élena directed by Yannick Muller - Elena
 2010 : Un certain dimanche directed by Tatiana Margaux Bonhomme - Jeanne
 2011 : Comme des héros directed by Véronique Jadin - Rose
 2011 : La France qui se lève tôt directed by Hugo Chesnard - Aurélie	
 2011 : Leçon de conduite directed by Élodie Lélue - Manon
 2012 : Une place directed by Arnaud Aussibal

Television 
 2011 : Comment va la douleur ? directed by François Marthouret – Fiona
 2011 : Une vie française directed by Jean-Pierre Sinapi – Marie Blick
 2016 : The Bureau directed by Éric Rochant – Céline Delorme
 2019 : Public Enemy directed by Matthieu Frances – Jessica
 2020 : Into the Night directed by Inti Calfat – Sylvie Bridgette Dubois
 2020 : 18h30 directed by Maxime Chamoux – Mélissa

Awards and nominations 
 2009: Best actress at the International festival of young directors, Saint-Jean-de-Luz for Le Bel Âge
 2010: Lumières Award for Most Promising Actress for Qu'un seul tienne et les autres suivront.
 2010: Gold star for Best actress newcomer /Étoile d'or de la révélation féminine for Qu'un seul tienne et les autres suivront.
 2010: César nomination for best actress newcomer/César du meilleur espoir féminin for Qu'un seul tienne et les autres suivront
 2011: Magritte Award, Most Promising Actress for Élève libre
 2014: Magritte Award, Best Actress for The Nun
 2015: Magritte nomination, Best Actress for Tokyo Fiancée

References

External links 
 
 
 

1989 births
Belgian film actresses
21st-century Belgian actresses
Magritte Award winners
Living people
People from Ixelles
Most Promising Actress Lumières Award winners